Lunlun is a feminine name.

Lunlun Zou, a Chinese musician
Hana no Ko Lunlun, an anime series
Dual! Parallel Trouble Adventure, also known as Dual! Parallel Lunlun Monogatari
Lun Lun, a famous giant panda at Atlanta Zoo in Atlanta, Georgia